Within the Cup is a 1918 American silent drama film directed by Raymond B. West and starring Bessie Barriscale, George Fisher and Edward Coxen.

Cast
 Bessie Barriscale as Thisbe Lorraine
 George Fisher as Le Saint Hammond
 Edward Coxen as Ernst Faber
 Aggie Herring as Tea Cup Ann
 Margaret Livingston

References

Bibliography
 Slide, Anthony. Aspects of American Film History Prior to 1920. Scarecrow Press, 1978.

External links
 

1918 films
1918 drama films
1910s English-language films
American silent feature films
Silent American drama films
American black-and-white films
Films directed by Raymond B. West
Films distributed by W. W. Hodkinson Corporation
1910s American films